In geometry, a facet is a feature of a polyhedron, polytope, or related geometric structure, generally of dimension one less than the structure itself. More specifically:
 In three-dimensional geometry, a facet of a polyhedron is any polygon whose corners are vertices of the polyhedron, and is not a face. To facet a polyhedron is to find and join such facets to form the faces of a new polyhedron; this is the reciprocal process to stellation and may also be applied to higher-dimensional polytopes.
 In polyhedral combinatorics and in the general theory of polytopes, a face that has dimension n − 1 (an (n − 1)-face or hyperface) is also called a facet.
 A facet of a simplicial complex is a maximal simplex, that is a simplex that is not a face of another simplex of the complex. For (boundary complexes of) simplicial polytopes this coincides with the meaning from polyhedral combinatorics.

References

External links

Polyhedra
Polyhedral combinatorics
Polytopes
Broad-concept articles